David Currey (born May 13, 1943) is a former college athletics administrator and American football player and coach.   He is the former athletic director at Chapman University, a position he had held from 1990 to 2015.  From 1977 to 1983, he coached at Long Beach State, where he compiled a 40–36 record. In 1980 and 1983, his teams won eight games. From 1984 to 1988, he served as the head football coach at the University of Cincinnati, where he compiled a 19–36 record. (He also briefly was athletic director in 1984.) His overall record as a coach was 59–72.

Head coaching record

College

References

External links
 Chapman profile

1943 births
Living people
American football running backs
Chapman Panthers athletic directors
Cincinnati Bearcats athletic directors
Cincinnati Bearcats football coaches
Long Beach State 49ers football coaches
Samford Bulldogs football players
Stanford Cardinal football coaches
UCLA Bruins football coaches
High school football coaches in California
California State University, Los Angeles alumni
Stanford University alumni
Sportspeople from Los Angeles County, California
Players of American football from California